Lugy is a commune in the Pas-de-Calais department in the Hauts-de-France region of France.

Geography
Lugy is situated 16 miles (25 km) northeast of Montreuil-sur-Mer on the D130 road.

Population

Places of interest
 The eighteenth century church of St.Pierre.
 A restored watermill

See also
Communes of the Pas-de-Calais department

References

External links

 Statistical data, INSEE

Communes of Pas-de-Calais